Chiang Chen GBM OBE (29 August 192313 March 2022) was a Hong Kong industrialist.

Biography
He was the founder and chairman of the Chen Hsong Holdings Limited since 1958. As a pro-Beijing entrepreneur, Chiang maintained good relations with the Chinese government, and was appointed a Hong Kong affair advisor. He was awarded the Grand Bauhinia Medal, the highest award under the Hong Kong honours and awards system on 1 July 2005 for his contributions in Hong Kong's industry. The Chiang Chen Studio Theatre in the Hong Kong Polytechnic University was also named after him.

He was the father of Hong Kong legislator Ann Chiang.

Chiang died on 13 March 2022, at the age of 98.

Awards
1997: Appointed Officer of the Order of the British Empire (OBE) "for services to the modernisation of manufacturing industry in Hong Kong."
2003: The George Washington University President's Medal
2005: Grand Bauhinia Medal

References

1923 births
2022 deaths
Hong Kong businesspeople
Hong Kong business executives
Hong Kong Affairs Advisors
Recipients of the Grand Bauhinia Medal
Officers of the Order of the British Empire
People from Heze
Businesspeople from Shandong
Chinese emigrants to British Hong Kong